Klangkarussell (German: Sound Carousel) is an Austrian electronic music duo formed in 2011. The two members of the group are Tobias Rieser and Adrian Held. Their biggest hit to date is "Sonnentanz", which reached the top 10 in six countries (Austria, Belgium, Germany, the Netherlands, the United Kingdom and Switzerland).

Music career

2011: Formation and early career
Before the duo formed, the name "Klangkarussell" referred exclusively to Rieser's solo work. At the same time, Adrian Held produced electronic music under the artist name i herald, a partial anagram of his real name. In 2011, the two artists produced their first songs together under the name "Heldenklang" (German: "Hero Sound"). Soon after, they began using Rieser's moniker Klangkarussell to refer to their ongoing collaboration.

2012–present: Breakthrough and Netzwerk
In June 2012 the duo released their debut single "Sonnentanz". The song peaked at number 3 in Austria, number 3 in Belgium, number 170 in France, number 4 in Germany, number 1 in the Netherlands and number 3 in Switzerland. A new version of the song was released in the United Kingdom on 18 August 2013, featuring vocals from Will Heard. In May 2014 they released their second single "Netzwerk (Falls Like Rain)". In July 2014 they released their debut studio album Netzwerk, which includes all three of the singles. Latest hits include "Hey Maria", a single edit released in September 2016.

Discography

Albums

Extended plays

Singles

Other charted songs

References

External links
 Official website
 Klangkarussell on Facebook
 Klangkarussell on Twitter

Austrian electronic music groups
Tropical house musicians